Ioannis Patakis (22 November 1940 – 10 April 2009)  was a Greek politician who was a Member of the European Parliament (MEP) from 2001 to 2004 for the Communist Party of Greece (KKE).

References

1940 births
2009 deaths
MEPs for Greece 1999–2004
Communist Party of Greece MEPs
People from Larissa (regional unit)